The 1991 French Figure Skating Championships took place in Reims for singles and in Dijon for ice dance. Skaters competed in the disciplines of men's singles, women's singles, and ice dancing on the senior level. The event was used to help determine the French team to the 1991 World Championships and the 1991 European Championships.

Results

Men

Ladies

Ice dance

External links
 French article

French Figure Skating Championships, 1991
1991 in French sport
French Figure Skating Championships